WOW! was a Dutch girl group in the late and early 90's who were produced by the duo Bolland & Bolland.

History 
WOW! scored their first hit in 1997 called Keer op Keer, which came from their album Wild + Ondeugend. The group scored another hit with Zomer'. The music video for The Night Before You Came'' was recorded in the Big Brother house.

The band consisted of Denise Koopal, Jenske Moermond, Joëlle van Noppen, Mandy Gruijters and Naomi Louwerens. After each other, Van Noppen and Koopal left the group in 1999 and 2000 respectively. The band restarted in May 2001 under the new name Blaze. However, this was unsuccessful.

WOW! appeared for the last time in its original line-up once in the radio program Coen and Sander Show.

Members
 Denise Koopal
 Jenske Moermond
 Mandy Gruijters
 Naomi Louwerens
 Joëlle van Noppen

After WOW! 

Denise Koopal presented call games for RTL.
Mandy Gruijters went to sing in the coverband Broadway and was the finalist of Popstars 2.
Joëlle van Noppen died in the Afriqiyah Airways Flight 771 plane crash on 12 May 2010.

Discography

Albums

Singles

References

External links 

 muziekencyclopedie.nl entry on Wow!

Dutch pop music groups
Dutch girl groups
Musical groups established in 1996
Musical groups disestablished in 2001